The 2022 Iowa gubernatorial election was held on November 8, 2022, to elect the governor of Iowa. Incumbent Republican Governor Kim Reynolds won re-election to a second full term in a landslide, defeating Democratic nominee Deidre DeJear.

First elected as lieutenant governor in 2010, Reynolds assumed the governorship on May 24, 2017, following the resignation of Governor Terry Branstad to take office as the U.S. Ambassador to China. She was elected in her own right in 2018 in what was considered a minor upset, before dramatically increasing her vote share in 2022. 

Reynolds flipped seven counties that had voted Democratic in the previous gubernatorial election, including multiple urban counties. The counties flipped were Black Hawk, Clinton, Des Moines, Dubuque, Jefferson, Lee, and Scott.

Republican primary

Candidates

Nominee 
Kim Reynolds, incumbent governor

Declined 

Results

Democratic primary

Candidates

Nominee
Deidre DeJear, small business owner and nominee for Secretary of State of Iowa in 2018

Withdrew
Ras Smith, state representative for the 62nd district

Declined
Rob Sand, Iowa State Auditor (ran for re-election)

Endorsements

Results

Minor parties and independents

Libertarian Party

Nominee 
 Rick Stewart, Libertarian nominee for U.S. Senate in 2020, Secretary of Agriculture of Iowa in 2018, and independent candidate for U.S. Senate in 2014 Marco Battaglia of Des Moines will be Stewart’s running mate.

Independents

Declared
Robert Bond

General election

Predictions

Endorsements

Polling
Aggregate polls

Graphical summary

Debates

Results

See also 
 2022 Iowa elections

Notes

Partisan clients

References

External links 
Official campaign websites
 Deidre DeJear (D) for Governor
 Kim Reynolds (R) for Governor
 Rick Stewart (L) for Governor

2022
Iowa
Governor